Scarlett Santana (born Jasmine Mercedes on May 31, 1988) is an American singer, songwriter, rapper, spoken word poet, dancer, and actress of Puerto Rican descent. She made her musical debut with the worldwide smash pop group C+C Music Factory. Scarlett Santana has released two singles with the group. The first being "Live Your Life", credited as C+C Music Factory presents Scarlett Santana, which was released in early 2010 on a Bill Coleman Remixxer compilation album. Scarlett Santana and C+C Music Factory then released a Top 10 Billboard smash, "Rain" to DJs in June 2011. "Rain" is currently supported by DJ Riddler, David Guetta, Robbie Rivera, StoneBridge and Dave Seaman, and was the No. 1 Breakout on the Billboard Dance Chart in October 2011.Santana has also become an accomplished co-director for her music videos, such as in "Rain", "Rain (Remix)", and "Live Your Life".

Early life

Born and raised in Newark, New Jersey by a single mother of three, Scarlett Santana was first exposed to music at home and in kindergarten. Scarlett Santana remembers vividly a joyful day at home with her mother to whom Scarlett Santana credits for her influence in music, listening to all the classics from soft Ballads to Disco to Fania All Stars Salsa musicians to mention a few. Scarlett Santana also credits her Music teacher Ms. Ivy Wallace for helping her find her voice through music. Ms. Wallace saw something special in Scarlett Santana and thus helped to develop her singing, as well as plant the seed for what has grown to be a dynamic and compelling stage presence. By age 12, Scarlett Santana was writing her own songs and resolute in her desire to touch the world with her music. Several years later, now armed with self-penned tracks, she'd pound the pavement looking for studio time and securing gigs at Nuyorican Poet's Café for her spoken word ability and singing in New York and New Jersey's hottest club venues including Club New York, Avalon, China Club, Orchard Beach festival, and Tribeca where Scarlett Santana opened for an artist who would become instrumental in her career- legendary Freestyle singer George Lamond. He took Scarlett Santana under his wing and became her mentor.  As of more recent, she has been honing her craft in acting under the mentorship of Hollywood actor Stu 'Large' Riley.

Music career
In her early adult years Scarlett Santana appeared on one of George Lamond’s albums, and being recognized for her talent, Scarlett Santana was soon commissioned to write a song for pop singer Radka, resulting in a song called "Hey Boy," a top 50 hit on the Billboard Dance Charts. Currently Scarlett Santana has George Lamond and Kulcha Don, an international Hip Hop/Reggae/Dance Hall artist featured on one of her songs "Live Your Life" the remix version, also produced by Robert Clivilles. Ever determined, Scarlett Santana continued to build her arsenal of music and spoken word poetry, anticipating the opportunity to share her words and experiences with audiences. As life would happen, George Lamond introduced Scarlett Santana to Robert Clivilles, an accomplished producer. Their collaboration resulted in Scarlett Santana's hit single, "Rain" – an inspirational song about the strong interpersonal relationships that hold you up through even the most trying times. Positivity is a common theme in Scarlett Santana's music as she hopes to inspire fans to believe that with perseverance, no goal is unattainable. And possessing such belief, Scarlett Santana crossed paths with Grammy nominated Producer & DJ Todd Terry during an NYC industry event in 2012 and thus resulted in their collaboration of "Attention". He is one of the artists and producers who helped to define New York's house music scene. ‘Todd the God’, they called him. Arguably he invented House music; certainly he defined it. Scarlett Santana is also collaborating with Duce Martinez, an accomplished Producer & DJ who has collaborated with the best in the industry and currently working on her next single.

Blessed with natural talent and unstoppable drive, Scarlett Santana was called upon to perform during the Spring of 2012 at the Winter Music Conference (WMC). WMC is one of the most publicized annual music gatherings in the world, a pivotal platform for the advancement of the industry. Moving into the summer of 2012, she was asked to walk the Red Carpet during New York International Latino Film Festival to support Latino Films, where Scarlett Santana received media attention for her support in the Arts within the Latino community. Subsequently, she has been interviewed on Planeta Gente (NTN24) cable network channel for her contribution in music. And as of recent, Scarlett Santana was asked to perform at the famous renowned House of Blues in Atlantic City.

Scarlett Santana is beyond a triple threat, she is set to take the music world by storm with an eclectic sound that draws from her Puerto Rican soulful roots and diverse taste developed in her youth through her mother and the music educators who touched her life. And in turn Scarlett Santana's music continues to touch so many others, including Ms. Dawn Diaz, founder of Milagros Day – "non-profit Organization that provides personal growth and professional development to Survivors of Domestic Violence". Ms. Dawn Diaz has selected Scarlett Santana's song, "Live Your Life" as Milagros Day Organization’ theme song due to its inspirational message and uplifting sound. As a result, Scarlett Santana along with La India, "La Princesa de la Salsa" or "The Salsa Princess" serve as ambassadors for Milagros Day because of their positive and inspirational messages they provide through their music. Scarlett was also asked to perform in Washington D.C, August 2012 to aid in the fund raising for St. Jude's Children's Hospital which she expresses ‘performing and supporting such a great cause is one of my biggest triumphs’ up to date.

Collaborations

Robert Clivilles from C+C Music Factory and Grammy Award winner, has written and produced for one of the biggest legendary superstars ‐ Mariah Carey, Whitney Houston, Michael Jackson, New Kids on the Block, Busta Rhymes, Lisa Lisa and Cult Jam, Aretha Franklin, James Brown, Luther Vandross, George Michael, Natalie Cole, Taylor Dayne, Anastasia, the Cover Girls, Seduction, and the list goes on.

George Lamond was the first Latino Freestyle solo artist to be fully recognized by the American music industry crossing over into markets like Adult Contemporary, R&B, Top 40, Dance and Salsa. He has had 7 international albums and has worked with some of the most respected people in the industry from Paul Simon and Marc Anthony to Johnny Rivera and Eddie Santiago.

Kulcha Don known worldwide for his verbal aesthetics in mainstream culture, blending of hip-hop, dancehall, reggaeton, and Caribbean roots music in turning heads and hips coast to coast. One of his hits "Drive You Crazy" featuring dancehall superstar Beenie Man. He also recorded with C+C Music Factory and worked with The Fugees on 1997's Original Wuckman.

Todd Terry, Grammy nominated producer defined New York house during the 80s. They called him "Todd The God." He produced milestone crossover remixes of the House era like "I'll House You" by the Jungle Brothers and "Missing" by Everything But The Girl by the mid 1990s. Todd has remixed songs for Annie Lennox, Bjork, Duran Duran, Michael Jackson, The Rolling Stones, and many more.

Discography

Singles
"Live Your Life" (2010), C+C Music Factory 
"Rain" (2011), C+C Music Factory 
"Attention" (2012), InHouse Records
"Flirtin' Wit Cha" (2012), InHouse Records
"You and Me" (2013), InHouse Records

References

3. Discogs – http://www.discogs.com/search?q=scarlett+santana&type=all

4. THISis50 – http://www.thisis50.com/profiles/blogs/latest-scarlett-santana-c-amp-c-music-factory-rain

5. ThatsEnuff – http://www.thisis50.com/profiles/blogs/latest-scarlett-santana-c-amp-c-music-factory-rain

6. Latin Trends – http://www.latintrends.com/?p=13083

7. Southern Boricua VIP ACCESS – http://sbvipaccess.com/?submit=Search&s=scarlett+santana

8. Vevo – https://www.vevo.com/watch/scarlett-santana

9. Scarlett Santana Official Website – http://www.scarlettsantana.com

External links 
 
 

American singer-songwriters
1988 births
Living people
21st-century American singers